Ingo Wittenborn (born 30 September 1964) is a German former cyclist. He competed in the individual pursuit event at the 1984 Summer Olympics.

References

External links
 

1964 births
Living people
German male cyclists
Olympic cyclists of West Germany
Cyclists at the 1984 Summer Olympics
Place of birth missing (living people)
Sportspeople from Bielefeld
Cyclists from North Rhine-Westphalia